The Ducati 65T, and the 65TL (Turismo Lusso) luxury version, were motorcycles manufactured by Ducati Meccanica S.p.A., from 1952 to 1958, coming out in the same year as the 98.  The 65TS (Turismo Sport) appeared in 1955, ten pounds lighter, with a different gas tank, lower handlebars and dual seat.

References

See also
List of motorcycles of the 1950s

65T
Standard motorcycles
Motorcycles introduced in the 1950s
Single-cylinder motorcycles